Magic Cat Academy is a series of browser games created as Google Doodles in celebration of Halloween. The first installment, Magic Cat Academy, was released on October 30, 2016, while the second installment, Magic Cat Academy 2, was released on October 30, 2020.

Story and gameplay

Magic Cat Academy
Players control Momo, a sorcerer cat. She goes to a magic school and defeats a ghost that steals her spellbook. Momo fights ghosts and bosses throughout five levels, taking place in the school's library, a cafeteria, a classroom, a gymnasium, and on the rooftop. Ghosts are defeated by clicking and swiping the mouse in certain directions, pertaining to the symbol atop the ghosts' heads. The swiping directions include a horizontal line, a vertical line, a "v" shape, a "ʌ" shape, and a lightning bolt, the latter-most of which summons lightning that weakens all onscreen enemies. On occasion, the player will be allowed to swipe in a heart-like shape to regain health.

Magic Cat Academy 2
The objective and the development of the game are exactly the same, only that the action takes place under the sea, since a ghost managed to escape from Momo after winning the first part, reaching the ocean and possessing various marine animals. Momo fights enemies in five stages, each at a deeper level, against ghosts and possessed animals such as an immortal jellyfish, a bank of bogues, a vampire squid and an anglerfish, until reaching the final boss, which is an underwater volcano. This game includes two new movements: a circle, by which the player gets a shield, and a spiral, by which the player pushes back all monsters. The shield lasts for only one attack.

Development
The creation of the game was coordinated amongst four different design groups, relating to art design, engineering, production, and music. The original concept for the game involved Momo making soup that resurrects dead spirits. The game's development involved many rejected concepts and ideas, including elaborate symbols to draw (such as a "Cat Hat" spell), as well as boss enemies like a chef ghost and a Venn diagram ghost.

The character of Momo was based on a real-life cat belonging to Google Doodler Juliana Chen. Momo also appears in the Doodle Champion Island Games (2021) Google Doodle.

References

External links
 Magic Cat Academy Official website
 Magic Cat Academy 2 Official website 

2016 video games
Single-player video games
Browser games
Games on Google platforms
Video games about cats
Video games about ghosts